Leptinella plumosa is a small flowering plant in the daisy family.  It is a circumantarctic species found on many subantarctic islands in the Southern Ocean.  The specific epithet comes from the Latin for “feathery”, referring to the form of the leaves.

Description
A highly variable species, Leptinella plumosa is a perennial herb that forms extensive mats.  Its creeping stems, growing up to 5 mm in diameter, have short, lateral branches with leaves in terminal rosettes.  It flowers from November to March, and fruits from February to May.

Distribution and habitat
The plant occurs in the Auckland, Antipodes, Campbell, Macquarie, Kerguelen, Prince Edward, Heard and Crozet Islands.  It is widespread in coastal areas and rare inland, but has been recorded at altitudes of up to 150 m above sea level.

Conservation status
In both 2009 and 2012 it was deemed to be "At Risk - Naturally Uncommon" under the New Zealand Threat Classification System, and this New Zealand classification was reaffirmed in 2018 (due to its restricted range) but with a further comment that it is secure overseas.

Gallery

References

Anthemideae
Asterales of Australia
Flora of Macquarie Island
Flora of the Auckland Islands
Flora of the Campbell Islands
Flora of the Antipodes Islands
Flora of the Kerguelen Islands
Flora of the Prince Edward Islands
Flora of the Crozet Islands
Flora of Heard Island and McDonald Islands
Plants described in 1844
Taxa named by Joseph Dalton Hooker